Johan Coenraad "Coen" Hissink (5 October 1878 – 17 February 1942) was a Dutch film actor of the silent era. He appeared in 25 films between 1914 and 1942.  He also wrote short stories and books about controversial topics such as homosexuality, prostitution and cocaine.  During the Second World War, he became a member of the resistance.  He was interned at Neuengamme concentration camp in 1941 and died there in 1942.

Filmography

 De Laatste Dagen van een Eiland (1942)
 De man zonder hart (1937)
 Klokslag twaalf (1936)
 Merijntje Gijzens Jeugd (1936)
 Op hoop van zegen (1934)
 De cabaret-prinses (1925)
 Amsterdam bij nacht (1924)
 Frauenmoral (1923)
 The Man in the Background (1922)
 Alexandra (1922)
 De bruut (1922)
 Menschenwee (1921)
 De zwarte tulp (1921)
 Blood Money (1921)
 Schakels (1920)
 Pro domo (1918)
 Het proces Begeer (1918)
 Levensschaduwen (1916)
 Het geheim van den vuurtoren (1916)
 Het wrak van de Noorzee (1915)
 Ontmaskerd (1915)
 De vrouw Clasina (1915)
 Fatum (1915)
 De vloek van het testament (1915)
 Een telegram uit Mexico (1914)

References

External links

 Death Register KZ-Gedenkstätte Neuengamme

1878 births
1942 deaths
Dutch male film actors
Dutch male silent film actors
People who died in Neuengamme concentration camp
People from Kampen, Overijssel
Dutch civilians killed in World War II
Dutch people who died in Nazi concentration camps